Saw Recordings is a house music record label created by Satoshi Tomiie and Hector Romero.  It has featured releases from artists such as Guti, Nathan Fake, Lexicon Avenue, SLOK, Medway, and Gabriel & Dresden.

See also
 List of record labels

External links

Saw Recordings Official Website
Saw Recordings Reviews from Progressive Sounds

American record labels
Electronic music record labels